Best Actress in a Supporting Role is a British Academy Film Award presented annually by the British Academy of Film and Television Arts (BAFTA) to recognize an actress who has delivered an outstanding supporting performance in a film.
This award began in 1968 and had four nominees until 1999 when expanded to five nominees. There has been one tie in this category. No award was given for the years 1980 and 1981.

Winners and nominees

1960s

1970s

1980s

1990s

2000s

2010s

2020s

Multiple nominations
9 nominations
 Judi Dench

4 nominations

 Amy Adams
 Maggie Smith

3 nominations

 Cate Blanchett
 Anjelica Huston
 Miranda Richardson
 Margot Robbie
 Kristin Scott Thomas
 Meryl Streep
 Julie Walters
 Billie Whitelaw
 Kate Winslet

2 nominations

 Rosanna Arquette
 Peggy Ashcroft
 Kathy Bates
 Brenda Blethyn
 Helena Bonham Carter
 Toni Collette
 Jamie Lee Curtis
 Sally Field
 Barbara Hershey
 Holly Hunter
 Rosemary Leach
 Lesley Manville
 Frances McDormand
 Carey Mulligan
 Lynn Redgrave
 Octavia Spencer
 Maureen Stapleton
 Imelda Staunton
 Emma Stone
 Tilda Swinton
 Sigourney Weaver
 Michelle Williams
 Shelley Winters

Multiple awards
3 awards
 Judi Dench

2 awards

 Kate Winslet

Age superlatives

See also
 BIFA Award for Best Supporting Actress
 Academy Award for Best Supporting Actress
 Critics' Choice Movie Award for Best Supporting Actress
 Golden Globe Award for Best Supporting Actress – Motion Picture
 Screen Actors Guild Award for Outstanding Performance by a Female Actor in a Supporting Role

References

 BAFTA Awards Database

British Academy Film Awards
 
Film awards for supporting actress